The United States of America has conducted espionage against the Soviet Union and its successor state, the Russian Federation.

Soviet Union 

Throughout the Cold War, acts of espionage, or spying, became prevalent as tension between the United States and Soviet Union increased. Information played a crucial role in the Cold War and would be essential to a victory of either side. Both the United States and Soviet Union understood this fact and invested greatly in espionage missions and technology.

Russian Federation 

According to U.S. government officials, as of 2016 the United States Intelligence Community had earmarked up to 10-percent of its budgets "to Russia-related espionage".

Incidents 
 In 2000 a former U.S. naval intelligence officer was convicted of espionage by a Russian court and sentenced to 20 years in prison, however, was later pardoned by Russian president Vladimir Putin. At the time of his arrest, the man had been seeking to purchase technical details about a Russian rocket-propelled torpedo; he later claimed he had only been seeking unclassified information regarding the torpedo for his technical consulting business.
 In 2013 Ryan Fogle, the third secretary at the U.S. embassy in Moscow, was deported from Russia after Russian counterintelligence officers caught him carrying two wigs, three pairs of sunglasses, a Moscow street atlas, $130,000 in cash, and "a letter offering up to $1-million a year for long-term cooperation".
 In 2017 a cybersecurity specialist working in the Federal Security Service was arrested by Russian authorities on suspicion of passing information to U.S. intelligence.

See also 
 Operation Ivy Bells
 Operation Lincoln
 1960 U-2 incident
 List of American spies
 Arrest of Mark Kaminsky and Harvey Bennett
 Global surveillance disclosures (2013–present)
 United States intelligence operations abroad
 History of Soviet and Russian espionage in the United States
 List of Soviet agents in the United States
 Espionage Act of 1917

References 

Soviet Union–United States relations
Espionage by period
Intelligence operations
Espionage in the Soviet Union